Ralph Weekly is an American softball coach who, along with his wife Karen, was the co-head coach at Tennessee from 2002 until his retirement in 2021.

Early life and education
Weekly graduated from Arizona State University in 1973. He earned his master's degree in international relations from Pacific Lutheran. Weekly served in the United States Air Force and retired in 1986.

Coaching career

Pacific Lutheran

Chattanooga

Tennessee

Head coaching record

College
References:

References

Living people
American softball coaches
Pacific Lutheran Lutes softball coaches
Chattanooga Mocs softball coaches
Tennessee Volunteers softball coaches
Year of birth missing (living people)
United States women's national softball team coaches